The Cevizlidere mine is a large copper mine located in Tunceli Province in eastern Turkey. Cevizlidere represents one of the largest copper reserves in Turkey, with estimated reserves of 445.7 million tonnes of ore grading 0.38% copper.

References 

Copper mines in Turkey
Buildings and structures in Tunceli Province
Ovacık District